Warren Bockwinkel (often misspelled Bockwinkle, May 21, 1911 – March 25, 1986) was an American professional wrestler.

Career
Bockwinkel competed in the National Wrestling Alliance and North American regional promotions during the 1930s, 1940s and 1950s. One of the earliest wrestlers to appear on television, he teamed with many of the top wrestlers of the day including Ray Vilmer, Killer Kowalski and "Classy" Freddie Blassie. Although he never won a world title during his career, he was involved in many high-profile feuds including against Ernie Dusek, Paul Boesch, Sandor Szabo, George Zaharias and NWA World Heavyweight Champion Lou Thesz.

He was also the trainer of several wrestlers of the "Golden Age of Wrestling"-era including Wilbur Snyder and, along with Lou Thesz, his son Nick Bockwinkel who would eventually become a major star in the American Wrestling Association winning the AWA World Heavyweight Championship six times during the 1970s and 1980s.

By 1955, he had retired, only coming out of retirement for a match with Hans Schmidt on October 2, 1957. Bockwinkel was inducted into the George Tragos/Lou Thesz Professional Wrestling Hall of Fame in 2010.

It is said that Bockwinkel wrestled a match in 1983 at 72 years old but is unverified.

Personal life
A personal friend of promoter Lord James Blears, he convinced Blears to allow Nick Bockwinkel to compete in his NWA Hawaii territory and later teamed with his son during the early 1950s. His son, Nick, later acknowledged his father in his induction speeches for the Professional Wrestling Hall of Fame and Museum in 2003 and the WWE Hall of Fame in 2007.

Death
Bockwinkel died on March 25, 1986.

Further reading
Conner, Floyd. Wrestlings Most Wanted: The Top 10 Book of Pro Wrestling's Outrageous Performers, Punishing Piledrivers and Other Oddities. Dulles, Virginia: Brassey's, 2001. 
Thesz, Lou. Hooker: An Authentic Wrestler's Adventures Inside the Bizarre World of Professional Wrestling. Wrestling Channel Press, 2001.

References

External links 
 SLAM! Wrestling: 2nd-gen grapplers reflect on their Dads by Greg Oliver
 Deceased Superstars – Warren Bockwinkel
 The WAWLI Papers #051-060
 Gary Will: Deceased Pro Wrestlers – A Tribute to Mat Stars of the Past
 

1911 births
1986 deaths
20th-century American male actors
American male professional wrestlers
Professional wrestlers from Missouri
Stampede Wrestling alumni
20th-century professional wrestlers